Whoever Slew Auntie Roo? (U.S. title: Who Slew Auntie Roo?) is a 1972 horror-thriller film directed by Curtis Harrington and starring Shelley Winters, Mark Lester, and Sir Ralph Richardson. Based partly on the fairy tale "Hansel and Gretel", the film focuses on a demented American widow living in her husband's English manor who becomes obsessed with a young orphan girl who resembles her dead daughter.

A co-production between the United States and the United Kingdom, the film was shot at Shepperton Studios in London. Like What Ever Happened to Baby Jane?, Hush...Hush, Sweet Charlotte, What Ever Happened to Aunt Alice, and What's the Matter with Helen?, it is one of the many films in the psycho-biddy subgenre. Whoever Slew Auntie Roo? and the latter film, also starring Winters, were released on DVD as a MGM Midnite Movies Double Feature, and Winters requested that Helen'''s director Harrington direct the picture.

Plot
Every year, Rosie Forrest, known as "Auntie Roo", throws a lavish overnight Christmas party for ten of the best-mannered children at the local orphanage. Despite her warm demeanour, Rosie is in fact demented and mentally ill and keeps the mummified remains of her daughter Katharine in a nursery room in the attic.

Christopher and Katy Coombs, an orphaned brother and sister, sneak into the party. Auntie Roo notices that Katy resembles her late daughter and warmly welcomes her and her brother. After the party ends, Auntie Roo kidnaps Katy with the intention of making her a substitute for Katherine. Christopher believes Auntie Roo is a witch who wants to devour him and his sister. He tries to warn people about Auntie Roo, and when no one believes him he returns to the house alone to rescue his sister.

Auntie Roo prepares a dinner for the coming New Year while Christopher assists her by gathering firewood. In the process, he steals the key to the nursery room and lets Katy out. During their escape, they steal Auntie Roo's jewelry and stuff it inside an old teddy bear that once belonged to Katharine. Christopher and Katy fight their way out of Auntie Roo's mansion. Once outside, they place the firewood at the door and set it on fire.

The orphans encounter Auntie Roo's butcher, Mr. Harrison, who is delivering a whole piglet by horsecart. He sees the smoke inside and drives off to call the fire brigade. Katy realizes that she was to cook the pig, but Christopher says that they were to be eaten after it. The fire brigade arrives and puts out the fire but are unable to rescue Auntie Roo. Inspector Willoughby takes the children back to the orphanage. Christopher and Katy smile at each other as they depart from the burned mansion, knowing that Auntie Roo will not harm anyone else and that they can use her jewelry (which Christopher calls "the wicked witch's treasure") to ensure their own happy ending.

Cast

Production
A co-production between the United States and the United Kingdom, the film was shot at Shepperton Studios in Shepperton, England in the spring of 1971.

ReleaseWhoever Slew Auntie Roo? was released theatrically in the United States in late 1971, opening regionally in several cities in Ohio and Pennsylvania on December 22, 1971.

Reception
Craig Butler from Allmovie wrote, "If one is in the right frame of mind, Who Slew Auntie Roo? can be a lot of ghoulish fun. It's not good, mind you; as a matter of fact, Roo is basically trash. But it's campy and silly and just the ticket if you're in the mood for a film that makes you groan at its inanity as often as it makes you shiver." On his website Fantastic Movie Musings and Ramblings, Dave Sindelar stated that the film "never really becomes either a full-blooded horror movie or an effective variation on the fairy tale. The scare scenes would be more effective if they didn’t seem so arbitrary, and the last third of the movie fails to build up the necessary tension or suspense." TV Guide awarded the film 2/5 stars and stated that the film "walks a fine line between good and bad taste, manipulating audience expectations and loyalties gleefully and shamelessly." The Terror Trap gave the film 3/4 stars, writing, "A nice retelling of the classic fairy tale Hansel and Gretel (with Winters clearly delighting in the devilish role), this is lovingly directed by genre regular Curtis Harrington."

See also
 Psycho-biddy
 What Ever Happened to Baby Jane? (1962)
 Hush...Hush, Sweet Charlotte (1964)
 What Ever Happened to Aunt Alice? (1969)
 What's the Matter with Helen? (1971)
 Dear Dead Delilah'' (1972)

References

External links

 
 
 
 
 

1972 films
1972 horror films
1970s Christmas films
1970s Christmas horror films
1970s horror thriller films
American Christmas horror films
American horror thriller films
American International Pictures films
British Christmas horror films
British horror thriller films
Films about orphans
Films based on Hansel and Gretel
Films directed by Curtis Harrington
Films set in country houses
Films shot at Shepperton Studios
Films with screenplays by Jimmy Sangster
Psycho-biddy films
1970s English-language films
1970s American films
1970s British films